Seweryn Goszczyński (4 November 1801, Illintsi - 25 February 1876, Lviv) was a Polish Romantic prose writer and poet.

Life
He was born on 4 November 1801 in Ilińce, Russian Empire and hailed from a Polish noble family of the Pobóg coat of arms. Goszczyński did not receive a thorough education because his parents were not well off. He studied with breaks in different schools, the Basilian School in Uman being the one where he stayed the longest period of time. At this school he made friends with Zaleski and Grabowski. In 1820 he moved to Warsaw, where he joined the secret Union of Free Polish Brothers.

On hearing the news about the outbreak of the insurrection in Greece, in August 1821, he walked to Ukraine in order to get to the fighting rebels via Odessa. Due to a lack of funds, he stopped in Ukraine, where he remained till 1830, engaging in conspiratorial activities. He frequently changed his lodging as he was being sought by the police. During this period he wrote many patriotic poems, including Uczta zemsty.

In June 1830 he returned to Warsaw and joined Piotr Wysocki’s conspiracy. He took part in the attack on the Belvedere Palace in November 1830; then he fought (with the rank of captain) in General J. Dwernicki’s corps. He took part in the battles at Stoczek and Nowa Wieś. After the capitulation of Warsaw he crossed the Prussian border together with General Rybiński’s corps. The experiences connected with this fact found their outlet in the poem Wyjście z Polski.

Eventually, he settled in Galicia, but did not give up his social and political activity. The Union of Twenty One was created on his initiative in Lwów in 1832. Around 1835 he established the Polish People’s Society in Kraków. He was the co-founder of the literary group Ziewonia. He hid under false names because the Austrian police were after him (a court in Warsaw had sentenced him by default to capital punishment). His stay at Podhale resulted in his interest in the culture of this region and the introduction of the Tatras into Polish literature.

In 1838 he emigrated to France. In Strasbourg he co-edited a satirical magazine "Pszonka", which was ideologically connected with the Polish Democratic Society. Here he met Mickiewicz and Słowacki. In 1842 he joined the Towiańczycy Circle. At that time he cut himself off from his previous political activities and gave up writing for many years. He remained faithful to the Circle till the end of his life. He was badly off, and almost died of starvation during The Paris Commune. In 1872 he came back to his home country thanks to his friends’ help. His countrymen enthusiastically welcomed him and he settled in Lwów. He died four years later, in 1876. He was buried in the  Łyczaków Cemetery in Lwów.

Zamek kaniowski
Zamek kaniowski, which was published in Warsaw in 1828, belongs to a group of very important romantic novels of Polish Romanticism. Its theme is woven around events which were based on the Haydamack Insurrection in Ukraine in 1768. Goszczyński used Ukrainian folklore in a very innovative way in order to create a poetic world. In this work, the fate of the protagonists and the course of historical events are dependent on the interference of evil forces which take part in earthly history. Zamek kaniowski was translated into Czech, French, German, Russian and Italian.

See also
Romanticism in Poland

References

Virtual Library of Polish Literature 
Catholic Encyclopedia: Polish Literature

Polish male writers
November Uprising participants
1801 births
1876 deaths